Min Khin Saw was the chief queen consort of the break-away kingdom of Toungoo (Taungoo) from 1597 to 1609. She was also the chief queen of Toungoo from 1584 to 1597 when Toungoo was a vassal state of Toungoo Empire. From 1612 onwards, the mother of Natshinnaung spent her last years as a dowager queen in Pinya (near Ava (Inwa).

Brief
Min Khin Saw was the only child born from the union of Queen Sanda Dewi and King Bayinnaung. She descended from the Ava royal line from her mother's side. She married her half-cousin Minye Kyawhtin, governor of Tharrawaddy (Thayawadi), on 1 May 1571.

The couple had four children:
 Natshinnaung, King of Toungoo (1609–1610); Viceroy of Toungoo (1610–1612)
 Minye Kyawswa of Toungoo, Crown Prince of Toungoo (1609–1612)
 Minye Thihathu III of Toungoo, Governor of Badon (1612–?)
 Minye Kyawhtin II of Toungoo, Governor of Taungdwingyi (1612–?)

Min Khin Saw became a dowager queen in 1609 when her husband died. She fled Toungoo in August 1612 when the combined forces of Portuguese Syriam (Thanlyin) and Martaban (Mottama) attacked Toungoo. King Anaukpetlun gave her a two-story house in Pinya (near Ava) with a retinue of servants.

Ancestry

Notes

References

Bibliography
 

Chief queens consort of Toungoo dynasty
1550s births
1610s deaths
16th-century Burmese women
17th-century Burmese women